Al Escudero (born ) is a computer game designer.

Career
Escudero is mostly self-taught in computers and gaming. He ran a bulletin board system, Castle Amber, beginning in 1986. In the early 1990s Escudero and Kris Hatlelid co-wrote The Majic Realm, a game played primarily through a bulletin board system that they owned, ICE Online, based in Burnaby, Canada.

Games
 Deathlord (1987)
 Dungeon Masters Assistant Volume 2: Characters & Treasures (1991)
 Renegade Legion: Interceptor (1991)
 Spelljammer: Pirates of Realmspace (1992)
 Dark Sun: Shattered Lands (1993)
 Al-Qadim: The Genie's Curse (1994)
 007: Nightfire (2002)
 007: Agent Under Fire (2002)
 007: Everything or Nothing (2004)
 The Incredible Hulk: Ultimate Destruction (2005)
 Dungeon Siege: Throne of Agony (2006)

References

1960s births
Living people
Dungeons & Dragons video game designers
Place of birth missing (living people)
Video game designers